Store Sommarøya or Sommarøya is an island in Tromsø Municipality in Troms og Finnmark county, Norway. The island is connected to the large neighboring island of Kvaløya by the Sommarøy Bridge and it is connected to the small island of Hillesøya by the Hillesøy Bridge. The fishing village of Sommarøy covers Store Sommarøya and part of Hillesøya.

Climate

Media gallery

See also
List of islands of Norway

References

Islands of Troms og Finnmark
Tromsø